Paio Pires de Guimarães (1100–?) was a medieval Knight and Rico-homem (rich man) of the County of Portugal. He was Lord of Riba de Vizela.

References

External links 
www.heraldrysinstitute.com

12th-century births
1150s deaths
12th-century Portuguese people
Portuguese nobility
Portuguese Roman Catholics